Ottawa County is the name of four counties in the United States:

 Ottawa County, Kansas 
 Ottawa County, Michigan 
 Ottawa County, Ohio 
 Ottawa County, Oklahoma

See also 
 County of Ottawa, a historical electoral district in Quebec, Canada